Yolande  Beckles is a British  educationalist and businesswoman. She founded Global Graduates  in 1998, a company aimed at raising the aspirations of, and teaching soft skills  to mainly ethnic minority children, but not solely made up from ethnic minority children. Global Graduates collapsed in 2003. After this, debts were left unpaid and at least nineteen County Court judgments were lodged against her.

In  2006, she starred in a three-part documentary series called Don't Mess with Miss Beckles which was aired on BBC Two. In it, she tried to motivate  three secondary school children (one per episode) to achieve more in their academic life. The reaction to the show in the media was polarised, with some praising her message of parental involvement in a child's learning,  while others suggested that the show was exploitative   and that her approach was misguided.  One of the parents featured in the show subsequently spoke out about  Beckles's 'wholly inappropriate' behaviour.  The screening of the program also prompted a number of Beckles's creditors to issue renewed calls for payment.  An individual claiming to be a friend of a creditor has since set up a website to monitor her activities.

Yolande Beckles is currently in Los Angeles, where she has set up an educational program called Think Global Kids  and been elected to a volunteer seat on the Greater Echo Park Elysian Neighborhood council.

She  was born in London in 1962 to parents of Trinidadian origin.  She has two siblings,  Brian and Hermione, and two children, Diandra and Euan.

References

English people of Trinidad and Tobago descent
Living people
Year of birth missing (living people)